The 2018 Diamond League was the ninth season of the annual series of outdoor track and field meetings, organised by the International Association of Athletics Federations (IAAF). It is the second edition to feature the new championship-style system.

Schedule
The following fourteen meetings are scheduled to be included in the 2018 season:

Season overview
 Events held at Diamond League meets, but not included in the Diamond League points race, are marked in grey background.
 Diamond league final winners are marked with light blue background.

Men

Track

Field

Women

Track

Field

2018 IAAF Diamond League Final

Men

Women

References

External links

Official website
Standings 2018

 
Diamond League
Diamond League